Ploubezre is a commune in the Côtes-d'Armor department of Brittany in northwestern France.

Population
Inhabitants of Ploubezre are called ploubezriens in French.

Breton language
In 2008, 6.45% of primary school children attended bilingual schools.

See also
Communes of the Côtes-d'Armor department
The Five Crosses, a Crucifix monument nearby

References

External links

Official site
Château de Kergrist

Communes of Côtes-d'Armor